The G1 Climax 29 was a professional wrestling tournament promoted by the Japan-based New Japan Pro-Wrestling (NJPW). The tournament commenced on July 6 and concluded on August 12, 2019. It is the twenty-ninth edition of G1 Climax, and forty-fifth edition of the tournament counting its previous forms under different names. A Block winner Kota Ibushi defeated B Block winner Jay White in the final to win the tournament.

Considered NJPW's most important tournament, the G1 Climax features twenty wrestlers, divided in two blocks of ten ("A" and "B"). Each participant faces all nine other wrestlers within the same block in singles matches. The winner of each block is determined via a point system, with two points for a win, one point for a draw, and no point for a defeat; each night of the event sees the ten members of one block compete for the tournament, while the members of the non-competing block perform in tag team matches that have no influence of the tournament results. On the final day of the event, the winners of both blocks face each other to determine the winner of the G1 Climax, who will gain a future match for the IWGP Heavyweight Championship at Wrestle Kingdom, NJPW's biggest yearly event.

The event saw the G1 Climax debut of Jeff Cobb, Jon Moxley, Taichi, Kenta, Shingo Takagi, and Will Ospreay as well as Lance Archer's first participation since 2014; this was Kenta's in-ring debut in NJPW. As usual, the tournament took place over several cities and locations; the 2019 edition marked the first time that the G1 Climax tournament took place outside of Japan, as the event opened with G1 Climax in Dallas at the American Airlines Center in Dallas, before moving back to Japan.

Production

Tournament rules 

NJPW announced that the 2019 edition and its dates of the G1 Climax on January 4, 2019, at Wrestle Kingdom 13; it was announced that the first night of the tournament will be held at the American Airlines Center in Dallas, marking the first time the tournament would be held outside of Japan. As per usual G1 Climax tradition, the tournament features twenty wrestlers, divided in two blocks of ten ("A" and "B"). Each participant faces all nine other wrestler within the same block in singles match, with the winner of each block being determined via a point system, gaining two points for a win, one point for a draw, and no point for a loss; each night of the event sees the ten members of a same block compete for the tournament, while the members of the non-competing block perform in tag team matches that have no influence of the tournament results, typically facing their future tournament opponents. In case of several wrestler sharing the top score, the results of the matches those wrestlers had when facing each other's in the tournament act as tiebreaker, with the one having the most wins over the other top-scorers determining the winner of the block.

On the final day of the event, the respective winners of both blocks face each other to determine the winner of the G1 Climax, who would gain a future match for the IWGP Heavyweight Championship, NJPW's top championship, at Wrestle Kingdom, NJPW's biggest yearly event; if the IWGP Heavyweight Champion himself wins, he gets to pick his opponent at Wrestle Kingdom. The low-card matches have a twenty-minutes time limit, while the matches of the tournament have a 30-minutes time limit (with the time limit being reached resulting in a tie); the final match between the two block winners has no time limit.

Storylines 
The event includes matches that result from scripted storylines, where wrestlers portray heroes, villains, or less distinguishable characters in scripted events that build tension and culminate in a wrestling match or series of matches.

First-time participant Jeff Cobb and returning participant Tomohiro Ishii announced their participation to the tournament on May 31, 2019.

On June 9, 2019, at Dominion 6.9 in Osaka-jo Hall, several wrestlers announced their decision to participate in the G1 Climax for the first time, including IWGP United States Champion Jon Moxley. Best of the Super Juniors winner Will Ospreay, immediately after defeating Dragon Lee to  win the IWGP Junior heavyweight Champion, also announced his intention to participate, marking a rare participation to the tournament by a member of the Junior Heavyweight division. Junior Heavyweight Shingo Takagi, who defeated heavyweight Satoshi Kojima at Dominion, announced his move to the Heavyweight division after the match, as well as his participation to the G1 Climax. Kenta, who had been released by WWE the previous February, made his surprise NJPW debut at the event, also announcing his participation in the G1 Climax.

Four time-participant Lance Archer, who had last participated to the tournament in 2014, announced his participation on June 10, 2019, via the company's official YouTube channel.

The twenty participants were officially announced on June 16, 2019. The list included six first-time participants, namely Cobb, Moxley, Ospreay, Takagi, Kenta, and Taichi, with fourteen participants returning from the previous year, and Archer returning after a five-year hiatus; participants from the previous year who did not return were Michael Elgin, Kenny Omega and Hangman Page, who had left NJPW, and Minoru Suzuki, Tama Tonga, Togi Makabe, and Yoshi-Hashi. The event marked Kenta's NJPW in-ring debut, while Moxley was still undefeated since joining the company.

Venues

Results

Night 1 (A Block) 

The first night of A Block took place on July 6, 2019, at the American Airlines Center in Dallas, Texas; it was promoted as G1 Climax in Dallas. It marked the first time that a night of the G1 Climax took place outside of Japan. This event was broadcast live on AXS TV in the United States and New Japan Pro-Wrestling World. The show would receive coverage from more mainstream publications such as Sports Illustrated and Deadspin.

Tournament scores

Night 2 (B Block) 
The first night of B Block took place on July 13, 2019, at the Ota City General Gymnasium in Ōta, Tokyo.

Tournament scores

Night 3 (A Block) 
The second night of A Block took place on July 14, 2019, at the Ota City General Gymnasium in Ōta, Tokyo.

Tournament scores

Night 4 (B Block) 
The second night of B Block took place on July 15, 2019, at the Hokkaido Prefectural Sports Center in Toyohira-ku, Sapporo.

Tournament scores

Night 5 (A Block) 
The third night of A Block took place on July 18, 2019, at the Korakuen Hall in Bunkyo, Tokyo.

Tournament scores

Night 6 (B Block) 
The third night of B Block took place on July 19, 2019, at the Korakuen Hall in Bunkyo, Tokyo.

Tournament scores

Night 7 (A Block) 
The fourth night of A Block took place on July 20, 2019, at the Korakuen Hall in Bunkyo, Tokyo.

Tournament scores

Night 8 (B Block) 
The fourth night of B Block took place on July 24, 2019, at the Hiroshima Sun Plaza in Nishi-ku, Hiroshima.

Tournament scores

Night 9 (A Block) 
The fifth night of A Block took place on July 27, 2019, at the Aichi Prefectural Gymnasium in Nagoya.

Tournament scores

Night 10 (B Block) 
The fifth night of B Block took place on July 28, 2019, at the Aichi Prefectural Gymnasium in Nagoya.

Tournament scores

Night 11 (A Block) 
The sixth night of A Block took place on July 30, 2019, at the Takamatsu City General Gymnasium Arena 1 in Kagawa.

Tournament scores

Night 12 (B Block) 
The sixth night of B Block took place on August 1, 2019, at the Fukuoka Citizen Gymnasium in Fukuoka.

Tournament scores

Night 13 (A Block) 
The seventh night of A Block took place on August 3, 2019, at the Osaka Prefectural Gymnasium in Namba, Osaka.

Tournament scores

Night 14 (B Block) 
The seventh night of B Block took place on August 4, 2019, at the Osaka Prefectural Gymnasium in Namba, Osaka.

Tournament scores

Night 15 (A Block) 
The eighth night of A Block took place on August 7, 2019, at the Hamamatsu Arena in Higashi-ku, Hamamatsu.

Tournament scores

Night 16 (B Block) 
The eighth night of B Block took place on August 8, 2019, at the Yokohama Cultural Gymnasium in Naka-ku, Yokohama.

Tournament scores

Night 17 (A Block) 
The ninth night of A Block took place on August 10, 2019, at the Nippon Budokan in Chiyoda, Tokyo and saw the finals of the A Block. Kota Ibushi defeated Kazuchika Okada to be declared the winner of the A Block.

Tournament scores

Night 18 (B Block) 
The ninth night of B Block took place on August 11, 2019, at the Nippon Budokan in Chiyoda, Tokyo and saw the finals of the B Block. Jay White defeated Tetsuya Naito to be declared the winner of the B Block.

Tournament scores

Night 19 (Final) 
The final night took place on August 12, 2019, at the Nippon Budokan in Chiyoda, Tokyo. A Block winner Kota Ibushi defeated B Block winner Jay White to be declared the winner of the tournament.

Final standings

Tournament overview 
{| class="wikitable" align=center style="margin: 1em auto 1em auto"
|-align="center"
! Block A !! Archer !! Evil !! Fale !! Ibushi !! Kenta !! Okada !! Ospreay !! Sabre !! Sanada !! Tanahashi
|-align="center"
! Archer
|  || Archer(10:02) || Archer(10:12) || Ibushi(11:42) || Kenta(11:58) || Okada(14:15) || Archer(18:16) || Sabre(10:43) || Sanada (10:28) || Tanahashi(11:58)
|-align="center"
! Evil
| Archer(10:02) ||  || Fale(11:33) || Evil(19:11) || Kenta(15:03) || Okada(27:00) || Evil(17:08) || Evil(16:00) || Evil(18:11) || Tanahashi(23:02)
|-align="center"
! Fale
| Archer(10:12) || Fale(11:33) ||  ||Ibushi(9:27) || Fale(7:20) || Okada(10:15) || Ospreay(9:08) || Sabre(6:30) || Fale(10:38) || Fale<br/ >(9:58)
|-align="center"
! Ibushi
| Ibushi(11:42) || Evil(19:11) || Ibushi(9:27) ||  || Kenta(20:51) || Ibushi(25:07) || Ibushi(27:16) || Ibushi(15:46) ||Ibushi(19:14) || Ibushi(15:53)
|-align="center"
! Kenta
| Kenta(11:58) || Kenta(15:03) || Fale(7:20) || Kenta(20:51) ||  || Okada(26:53) || Ospreay(16:33) || Sabre(16:26) || Sanada(16:10) || Kenta(18:35) 
|-align="center"
! Okada
| Okada<br/ >(14:15) || Okada<br/ >(27:00) || Okada(10:15) || Ibushi(25:07) || Okada(26:53) ||  || Okada(21:56) || Okada(12:01) || Sanada(29:47) || Okada(22:04)
|-align="center"
! Ospreay
| Archer(18:16) || Evil(17:08) || Ospreay(9:08) || Ibushi(27:16) || Ospreay(16:33) || Okada(21:56) ||  || Sabre(20:02) || Ospreay(17:06) || Ospreay(17:12)
|-align="center"
! Sabre
| Sabre(10:43) || Evil(16:00) || Sabre(6:30) || Ibushi(15:46) || Sabre(16:26) || Okada(12:01) ||Sabre(20:02) ||  || Sanada(21:12) || Tanahashi (13:56)
|-align="center"
! Sanada
| Sanada(10:28) || Evil(18:11) || Fale(10:38) ||Ibushi(19:14)  ||Sanada(16:10) || Sanada(29:47) || Ospreay(17:06) || Sanada(21:12) ||   || Tanahashi(18:07)
|-align="center"
! Tanahashi
|Tanahashi(11:58) ||Tanahashi(23:02) || Fale(9:58) || Ibushi(15:53) || Kenta(18:35) || Okada(22:04) || Ospreay(17:12) || Tanahashi (13:56)
| Tanahashi(18:07) ||  
|-align="center"
! Block B  !! Cobb !! Goto !! Ishii !! Moxley !! Naito !! Robinson !! Taichi !! Takagi !! White !! Yano
|-align="center"
! Cobb
|  || Goto<br/ >(11:20) || Ishii(18:33) || Moxley(8:54) || Naito(12:47) || Cobb(13:21) || Cobb(12:30)||Cobb<br/ >(12:27) ||White<br/ >(15:50) || Cobb(5:16)
|-align="center"
! Goto
| Goto<br/ >(11:20) ||  ||Goto<br/ >(18:01) || Goto(8:38) || Naito(16:01) || Robinson(12:23) ||Taichi<br/ >(12:11) || Takagi(15:10) || Goto(21:06) || Goto(1:42)
|-align="center"
! Ishii
| Ishii(18:33) ||Goto<br/ >(18:01) ||  || Moxley(20:36) || Naito(18:58) || Ishii(17:54) || Taichi(11:56) || Takagi(22:41) || Ishii(19:13) || Ishii<br/ >(9:36)
|-align="center"
! Moxley
| Moxley(8:54) || Goto(8:38) || Moxley(20:36)  ||  || Moxley(16:41) || Robinson(16:26) || Moxley(7:36) ||Moxley<br/ >(14:45)|| White<br/ >(15:15) ||Yano<br/ >(5:08)
|-align="center
! Naito
| Naito(12:47) || Naito(16:01) || Naito(18:58) || Moxley(16:41) ||  ||Naito<br/ >(13:47) || Taichi(21:01) || Naito<br/ >(27:15) || White(18:51) || Yano(3:42)
|-align="center"
! Robinson
| Cobb(13:21) || Robinson(12:23) || Ishii(17:54) || Robinson(16:26) || Naito<br/ >(13:47) ||  || Taichi<br/ >(12:27) || Robinson(14:41) || White(23:01) ||Robinson<br/ >(4:28)
|-align="center"
! Taichi
| Cobb(12:30) ||Taichi<br/ >(12:11) || Taichi(11:56) || Moxley(7:36) || Taichi(21:01) || Taichi<br/ >(12:27) ||  || Takagi(14:40) ||White<br/ >(15:07) || Yano(5:04)
|-align="center"
! Takagi
|Cobb<br/ >(12:27) || Takagi(15:10) || Takagi(22:41) ||Moxley<br/ >(14:45) || Naito<br/ >(27:15) || Robinson(14:41) || Takagi(14:40) ||  || White(19:26) || Takagi(6:16)
|-align="center"
! White
|White<br/ >(15:50) || Goto(21:06) || Ishii(19:13) || White<br/ >(15:15) || White(18:51) || White(23:01) ||White<br/ >(15:07) || White(19:26) ||  || Yano(3:04)
|-align="center"
! Yano
| Cobb(5:16) || Goto(1:42) || Ishii<br/ >(9:36) || Yano<br/ >(5:08) || Yano(3:42) || Robinson<br/ >(4:28) || Yano(5:04) || Takagi(6:16) || Yano(3:04) ||  
|}

Reception 
Between nights 7 and 8, Deadspin noted how the 2019 G1 Climax offered an excellent platform for Jon Moxley to shine following his departure from WWE; they notably singled out his match against Tomohiro Ishii, calling it "almost certainly Moxley’s best singles match ever, under any name, but it felt significant in another sense. It was good, brutal fun to watch, but it also pointed a way forward for Moxley not just as an attraction, but rather as a brilliant and brilliantly violent wrestler." Many of the tournament's matches were acclaimed, with eight of them attaining a rating of five or more stars by wrestling journalist Dave Meltzer.

References

External links
G1 Climax at NJPW.co.jp 

New Japan Pro-Wrestling tournaments
New Japan Pro-Wrestling shows
2019 in professional wrestling
July 2019 events in the United States
July 2019 events in Japan
August 2019 events in Japan
2019 in Texas
2019 in Tokyo
Events in Dallas
Events in Tokyo
Events in Sapporo
Events in Osaka
Professional wrestling in Texas
Professional wrestling in Tokyo
Professional wrestling in Osaka